Jacob Cherry (born September 15, 1996) is an American actor. He is best known for playing the role of Nick Daley in Night at the Museum (2006) and in its sequel Night at the Museum: Battle of the Smithsonian (2009).

Early life
Cherry was born in New Jersey.

Career
Cherry's film debut was in Friends with Money. He appeared as Nick Daley in Night at the Museum and Night at the Museum: Battle of the Smithsonian, and as Travers McLain in Desperate Housewives. Cherry did not reprise his role as Nick Daley in the third Night at the Museum film installment. He also appeared on Fox's short-lived series Head Cases. He appeared in an episode of Criminal Minds, as a patient's son in Fox's medical drama House, and in an episode of Fox's crime drama Bones. He appeared on The Sorcerer's Apprentice as 10-year-old David Stutler.

Filmography

Film

Television

Nominations

References

External links

1996 births
21st-century American male actors
American male child actors
American male film actors
American male television actors
Living people
Male actors from New Jersey
Old Bridge High School alumni
Chapman University alumni